Ta'ala Albi is a studio album by Dina Hayek. The album was a major hit and its title track topped charts and became one of Dina's most popular videos.

Track listing 
"Ta'ala Albi" (Come, my Heart)
"Ma El Helo" (Whos the Sweet?)
"Dari Aynayek" (Turn Your Eye)
"Darb el Hawa" (Storm)
"Bainy we Bainak" (Between You and Me)
"Wallah Tae'ab" (I Swear I'm Tired)
"Shoo Bkhaaf" (Look, I'm afraid)
"Khalas Ertaht" (Enough, I'm Relieved)
"Ma Baddi Trooh" (I Dont Wanna Go)
"Bahlam Berjooa'ak" (I Dream of Your Return)
"Baddi Habibi" (I want to, my love)

2006 albums
Dina Hayek albums
Arabic-language albums
Rotana Records albums